Lambton High School is a government-funded co-educational comprehensive secondary day school, located in the suburb of Lambton in Newcastle, New South Wales, Australia.

Established in 1974, the school enrolled approximately 1,130 students in 2018, from Year 7 to Year 12, of whom five percent identified as Indigenous Australians and 15 percent were from a language background other than English. The school is operated by the New South Wales Department of Education; the principal is Gary Bennett; the deputy principal’s are Darren Mitten and Grant Godfrey; the Captains are Ryan Robinson and Jessamy Sewell; and the Vice Captains are Lachlan van der Vliet and Keama Sullivan.

Overview 
Some of the teaching staff have received national recognition for their work. One example is Former Head Teacher Science, Carolyn Hayden (retired now part-time Environmental Coordinator). The school is notable for its traditions such as Green Day, which is held annually.

Gifted and talented education 
Lambton High School offers a gifted and talented students (GATS) program to several years with Year 7 students completing a 'Master-Minds' course, Year 8 students completing an Authentic Learning Assessment, select Year 9 students being part of a semester GATS Class completing projects of their choice, and Year 10 students participating in an "Authentic Job Interview" at school. Talented students are asked whether they would like to participate in the accelerated Higher School Certificate and university courses in a wide variety of fields. Some year 10 students are also given the opportunity to participate in a 10 unit University excelleration programme where they can complete 10 units of a field of their choice (provided it is being run).

As part of Lambton High School's GATS program, students are encouraged to excel in all areas of their education: academic, sporting, cultural and leadership activities. In 2009, Carmel Tebbutt, the NSW Minister for Education presented 40 students from all NSW public schools with a Minister's Award for Excellence. Three Lambton High School students were fortunate to receive this award, Annabel Fleming, Caitlyn Read and Leah Serafim. This was the greatest number of awards received by any one school within the state.

History

Lambton High School was formed in 1974, by the merger of Newcastle Hill Boys High School and Hamilton Girls High School.

In June 2007 storms and flooding in the Hunter Region affected Lambton High School. The school suffered a small amount of damage (mainly to large trees within the school grounds that had to be cleared prior to student occupation) and was closed from 11 to 12 June 2007. The school was re-opened on 13 June 2007, to seniors only and was opened to all years on 18 June 2007.

On 29 September 2008, the Federal Cabinet (including Prime Minister Kevin Rudd) attended Lambton High School as part of the Australian Government Community Cabinet Program.

Examination results
At the 2009 HSC, Lambton High School ranked 143rd in New South Wales, up from 150th in 2008. In 2008, it increased its student "All rounders" from 33 to 47.

However, in 2014, Lambton High's HSC ranking fell to 388th in the state from 198th in 2013, which was the largest decline of any school in the Newcastle, Lake Macquarie, Upper Hunter or Central Coast Region.

Student leadership
Lambton High School promotes student leadership through groups such as the "Senior Student Body" and the "Student Representative Council". The Senior Student Body is made up of a number of Year 12 students who are elected by peers and staff for a period of twelve months. This body is led in turn by the school captains, the vice-captains and the senior prefects. The Captains for 2023 are Ryan Robinson and Jessamy Sewell, and the Vice Captains for 2023 are Lachlan van der Vliet and Keama Sullivan. Carolyn Hayden is responsible for student leadership. The Student Representative Council (SRC), is made up of two students from each year group (Years 7-11) and the senior prefects. This group is elected in early February each year and in turn elects its own leaders. The school principal is responsible for the SRC. Other leadership opportunities are available through various sporting teams and environmental committees.

Co-curricular activities

Green Day 
In 1995 the school began celebrating "Green Day", to raise awareness about environmental problems and promote environmental sustainability. In 2007, the Green Day slogan was "Keep on Rockin' For a Green World" and the focus was on climate change and global warming.

Sport 
The school also holds prestigious positioning in events such as basketball, netball and waterpolo. The school includes swimming, athletics and cross country carnivals and facilitating opportunities for students through regional sporting competitions by entering up to 30 school team.

Notable alumni
 Ben Kantarovski – soccer player 
 Jessica Legge  – swimmer
 Samantha Poolman – netball player  
 Leah Poulton – cricketer

See also 

 List of government schools in New South Wales
 Education in Australia

References

External links 
 

Education in Newcastle, New South Wales
Public high schools in New South Wales
1974 establishments in Australia
Educational institutions established in 1974